Little Bird of Happiness (1988, Persian:پرنده کوچک خوشبختی) is an Iranian film by the director Pouran Derakhshandeh. The script was written by Sirus Taslimi. The original Persian title is Parandeyeh koochake khoshbakhti. The film won the Crystal Simorgh for Best Film (co-winner with Kani Manga by Seifollah Dad).

References

Iranian drama films
1988 films
1980s Persian-language films
Crystal Simorgh for Best Film winners